= Tennis Federation of Vojvodina =

Sporting regulatory body

The Tennis Federation of Vojvodina (Serbian: Teniski savez Vojvodine) is the regional governing body of tennis in Vojvodina, Serbia. The association's president is Milan Jerinkić.

The federation has 40 member clubs. In 2008 the federation opened Serbia's first national tennis centre.
